Arbinia is a genus of snout moths. It was described by Heinrich Benno Möschler, in 1881, and contains the species Arbinia todilla. It is found in Suriname.

The wingspan is about 45.8 mm.

References

Chrysauginae
Monotypic moth genera
Moths of South America
Pyralidae genera
Taxa named by Heinrich Benno Möschler